Pablo Christiani (or Paul Christian; né "Saúl" or "NN שאול בן" ) was a Sephardic Jew who, having converted to Christianity, used his position as a Dominican friar to endeavor to convert other Jews in Europe to Roman Catholicism.

Early life and conversion
Saúl (Shaul ben NN) was born in 13th-Century Spain to a pious Jewish family, and he is believed to have been a student of Rabbi Eliezer of Tarascon.  Having married a Jewish woman and fathered children with her, he took his children from his wife when he left her after he converted himself and the children to Roman Catholicism. He then joined the Dominican Order as a friar.

Disputation of Barcelona and aftermath

Prior to the 1263 Disputation of Barcelona, he followed Nicholas Donin's lead in attempting to ban the Talmud, which he argued had "irrational" textual material. As for his participation in the Disputation, it was his attempt to convert Nahmanides and other fellow Jews to Christianity. The failure to convert anybody during the Disputation did not, however, discourage Christiani. Through the agency of Raymond de Penyafort and with letters of protection from King James I of Aragon, he went on missionary journeys and compelled Jews everywhere to listen to his speeches and answer his questions, both in synagogues and at wherever else he pleased. He even required his audiences to defray the expenses of his missions.

Campaign against the Talmud and immigration to France

In spite of the protection granted him by the king, Christiani did not meet with the success that he had expected on his missions. He therefore, in 1264, went to Pope Clement IV and denounced the Talmud, making assertions that it contained passages that were derogatory in regards to Jesus and Mary. He thus persuaded the pope to issue a bull that commanded the bishop of Tarragona to submit all copies of the Talmud to scrutiny by the Dominicans and Franciscans.

The bishop of Tarragona then ordered King James to appoint a commission that consisted of Christiani and others who would act as censors of the Talmud. Christiani and the rest of the commission hence redacted all of the passages which they deemed were hostile to Christianity.

Five years later, Christiani interceded with King Louis IX of France and obtained from him the permission to enforcement of the canonical edict that required Jews to wear badges which would single them out as Jews.

See also
Criticism of Judaism (Rabbinic Judaism)
Criticism of the Talmud

References

External links
Jewish Encyclopedia: "Christiani, Pablo" by Richard Gottheil & Isaac Broydé (1906). Now in public domain.

Converts to Roman Catholicism from Judaism
13th-century French Sephardi Jews
French Dominicans
Critics of Judaism
Spanish Jews
13th-century people from the Kingdom of Aragon
Spanish Roman Catholic priests